Khaneqah-e Sadat (also Romanized as Khāneqāh-e Sādāt and Khāneqāh Sādāt; also known as Khanaya) is a village in Khanandabil-e Sharqi Rural District, in the Central District of Khalkhal County, Ardabil Province, Iran. At the 2006 census, its population was 304, in 70 families.

References 

Tageo

Towns and villages in Khalkhal County